The Engler was a cyclecar manufactured in Pontiac, Michigan by the W.B. Engler Cyclecar Company from 1914 to 1915.  The Engler was a two-seater cyclecar that used a DeLuxe air-cooled, a 1.2L two-cylinder engine.  The vehicle had a friction transmission and belts, and cost $385.

See also
Brass Era car

References
 

Defunct motor vehicle manufacturers of the United States
Motor vehicle manufacturers based in Michigan
Cyclecars
Companies based in Pontiac, Michigan